The 1926 Chattanooga Moccasins football team represented the University of Chattanooga as a member of the Southern Intercollegiate Athletic Association (SIAA) during the 1926 college football season. The team tied for the SIAA championship. Frank Thomas was head coach.

Schedule

References

Chattanooga
Chattanooga Mocs football seasons
Chattanooga Moccasins football